Pompano Citi Centre is a primarily open-air shopping mall in Pompano Beach, Florida. The center consists of a big box retailer strip, in addition to a small lifestyle center section. The mall's main anchor stores are JCPenney, Lowe's, Ross Dress For Less, Big Lots, and Pet Smart. Burlington, TJ Maxx, and Five Below will move into the former Sears with both stores scheduled to open in fall 2020.

History
Pompano Fashion Square was originally developed by Leonard L. Farber, Inc. in 1970 and the first regional shopping hub in Broward County. The enclosed mall's original anchors were 2 level Burdines, Sears, and JCPenney stores and a 1-story Jordan Marsh. The center was renamed Pompano Square and renovated in 1985 to better compete with newer shopping centers in the area. Jordan Marsh became Mervyn's in 1992 which gave the mall a similar fashion to the newly opened Pembroke Lakes Mall. The store in turn closed in 1997 when Dillard's bought the building. The structure in turn didn't reopen by the retailer and instead remained vacant until it was demolished in 2003 for Lowe's which opened a year later. By the early 2000s, however, Pompano Square was a dead mall. Interest in redevelopment surfaced also in 2004, and Faison revitalized the center into its current state in 2006. Moreover, Burdines merged with Macy's also in 2003 and just simply to Macy's in 2005 while a downsized JCPenney and Sears were retained from the old mall.

Sterling Organization purchased the mall from Faison in 2012. Since then, the new owners have worked on rebranding, a new website, to bring lively events to the mall and to also to fill the mall with more exciting tenants. Sears sold its store to Sterling on January 2, 2018, and the acquisition could give the opportunity to redevelop the store, which closed on December 16, 2018.

A carousel is located in front of JCPenney as entertainment. It was added in 2012, after Sterling bought the mall.

On January 8, 2020, it was announced that Macy's would close in April 2020 as part of a plan to close 125 stores nationwide.

References

External links
Pompano Citi Centre official website

Shopping malls in Broward County, Florida
Shopping malls established in 1970
Buildings and structures in Pompano Beach, Florida
1970 establishments in Florida